Nicolás Guirin Chialvo (born 7 May 1995) is a Uruguayan footballer who plays as a goalkeeper for Primera División side Club Plaza Colonia de Deportes.

References

External links
Profile at Euro Sport

1995 births
Living people
Plaza Colonia players
Uruguayan Primera División players
Uruguayan Segunda División players
Uruguayan footballers
Association football goalkeepers